The Gruenewald House is a historic home located at 626 Main Street in downtown Anderson, Madison County, Indiana.  This three story Italianate / Second Empire style house was built in 1860. The house was the home of Martin Gruenewald, a local businessman. The home is decorated with turn of the century furnishings. The house was built in two parts. The back was built in 1860 with the front added in 1873 by Moses Cherry. Martin Gruenewald purchased the house shortly thereafter and resided there for 50 years. The Gruenewald House is operated as a house museum.

It was listed in the National Register of Historic Places in 1976. It is located in the Anderson Downtown Historic District.

References

 Anderson: A Pictorial History by Esther Dittlinger, copyright 1991, page 53.

External links
Gruenewald House web page

Historic house museums in Indiana
Houses on the National Register of Historic Places in Indiana
Italianate architecture in Indiana
Second Empire architecture in Indiana
Houses completed in 1860
Museums in Madison County, Indiana
Buildings and structures in Anderson, Indiana
Tourist attractions in Anderson, Indiana
National Register of Historic Places in Madison County, Indiana
1860 establishments in Indiana
Historic district contributing properties in Indiana